Alpine veronica is a common name for several plants and may refer to:

Veronica alpina, native to Europe and Asia
Veronica wormskjoldii, native to North America